Geneviève Rioux (born 3 November 1961) is a Québécoise television host and actor in theatre, television and film.

Biography

Geneviève Rioux graduated from the Conservatoire d'art dramatique de Montréal in 1983.

In 1987 Rioux was nominated for a Genie Award for her second film role, Danielle in Le Déclin de l'empire américain.

In 1989 she won the Gascon-Roux Prize for best theatre actress in Roméo et Juliette. That year she also won the Prix Gémeaux for Best Female Performance in a Supporting Role – Dramatic for  television series.  Rioux won the Prix Gémeaux again in 2004 for her dramatic role in the series Chartrand et Simonne.

In the theatre, she interpreted the classical and contemporary repertoire. She has played in more than 30 pieces, including: Le prince des jouisseurs of Gabriel Sabourin, directed by Normand Chouinard; Rouge gueule of Étienne Lepage, directed by Claude Poissant; Un certain Stanislavski by Marcel Sabourin and Gabriel Sabourin, directed by Louis Choquette; Clash by Daniel Lemire, directed by Pierre Lebeau; Under construction by Charles L. Mee, directed by Luce Pelletier; Les grecques mounted by Luce Pelletier; Le jeu de l'amour et du hasard of Marivaux, edited by Danielle Fichaud; Le portier de la gare Windsor by Julie Vincent; Le Misanthrope by Molière, edited by Olivier Reichenbach; Shakespeare's Roméo et Juliette, edited by Guillermo de Andrea.

Geneviève Rioux conceived and co-wrote the documentary Crée-moi, crée-moi pas (English version: Impulses), directed by Marie-Pascale Laurencelle, produced by Marie-France Bazzo and broadcast on Télé-Québec in January 2013.

Since 2001 Rioux has been a member of the women's committee of Union des Artistes, advocating for equal pay and against ageism.

Works

Film
1986 Qui a tiré sur nos histoires d'amour – Ginette
1986 Le Déclin de l'empire américain – Danielle
1989 Blue la magnifique – Doris
1989 Cruising Bar – Sonia
1989 Le Diable est une petite fille
1990 Cargo –  Alice
1991 Montreal Stories (Montréal vu par...) – herself
1995 Magical Flowers (Les Fleurs magiques) – Miche
2004 Jack Paradise: Montreal by Night (Jack Paradise : Les nuits de Montréal) – Gisèle
2004 Premier juillet, le film – Lise
2006 La Lâcheté – Juliette
2011 La Vérité – Caroline
2015 Les bons sentiments – Carole
2017 It's the Heart That Dies Last (C'est le cœur qui meurt en dernier) – Marie-Ève

Television
1987–1990  – Stéphanie
1994 La Glace et le Feu – Isabelle Duchesnay
1995–2000 Les Machos – Louise
2000, 2003 Chartrand et Simonne – Simonne Monet
2000–2004 L'art d'être parent – herself (host)
2001 Rivière-des-Jérémie – Ève
2003 Un gars, une fille – Isabelle
2004 À la découverte des haciendas – herself (host)
2005–2007 Les Poupées russes – Sophie-Catherine
2005, 2007 Casino – Monique
2007 Annie et ses hommes – Brigitte
2011–2012 Le tour du jardin – herself (host)
2013–2014 Toute la vérité – Maître Julie St-Pierre 
2014–2017 Subito texto – Nicole Préfontaine

Theatre
Over 30 pieces, notably:
Le prince des jouisseurs of Gabriel Sabourin, directed by Normand Chouinard
Rouge gueule of Étienne Lepage, directed by Claude Poissant
Un certain Stanislavski by Marcel Sabourin and Gabriel Sabourin, directed by Louis Choquette
Clash by Daniel Lemire, directed by Pierre Lebeau
Under construction by Charles L. Mee, directed by Luce Pelletier
Les grecques mounted by Luce Pelletier
Le jeu de l'amour et du hasard of Marivaux, edited by Danielle Fichaud
Le portier de la gare Windsor by Julie Vincent
Le Misanthrope by Molière, edited by Olivier Reichenbach
Shakespeare's Roméo et Juliette, edited by Guillermo de Andrea.

Awards
Won:
1989 –  – Best Theater Actress for Roméo et Juliette, TNM (Montreal)
1989 – Prix Gémeaux – Best Female Performance supporting role: Dramatic for L'Héritage (TV)
2004 – Prix Gémeaux – Best female lead actor: Dramatic for Chartrand et Simonne (TV)
Nominated:
1987 – Genie Award – Best Supporting Actress Award for Le Déclin de l'empire américain
2001 – Métrostar Award – Best Female Role in a Quebec TV series for Chartrand et Simonne
2004 – Métrostar Award – Best Female Role in a Quebec TV series for Chartrand et Simonne
2006 – Prix Gémeaux – Best Female Performance supporting role: Dramatic for the TV series Casino
2013 – Audience Award – for Crée-moi, crée-moi pas at the Brooklyn Girl Film Festival
2014 – Prix Gémeaux – Best Female Performance Supporting Role: Dramatic for Toute la vérité

References

1961 births
Living people
Actresses from Quebec City
Canadian feminists
Canadian stage actresses
Canadian television hosts
French Quebecers
Canadian women television personalities
Canadian women television hosts